This is a list of newspapers in Delaware.

Current

School newspapers

Defunct

Unconfirmed

See also
 Delaware media
 List of radio stations in Delaware
 List of television stations in Delaware
 Media of locales in Delaware: Dover, Wilmington

References

Notes

Citations

Bibliography

External links

  (Directory ceased in 2017)